Magnolia laevifolia is a species of flowering plant in the family Magnoliaceae, native to south-central China. Hardy to USDA zone 8, it easily tolerates pruning, and can be formed into topiaries, hedges and screens. The Royal Horticultural Society recommends the 'Gail's Favourite' cultivar for small gardens.

References

laevifolia
Ornamental trees
Endemic flora of China
Flora of South-Central China
Plants described in 2007